George Lovejoy "Doc" Rockwell (March 19, 1889March 2, 1978) was an American vaudeville performer and radio personality.

Life and career
Rockwell was born in Providence, Rhode Island, the son of Julia (Holden) and George Lyton Rockwell. Rockwell was a fast-talking "nut comic" who developed an act as a lecturing doctor.

One sign of Rockwell's success was his appearances as the headline act at the Palace Theater in New York City, the single most coveted booking in vaudeville.  Rockwell headlined at the Palace six times, the first in April 1925, the last in May 1932.  

In the 1930s, he also appeared on the inaugural bill at Radio City Music Hall (on December 27, 1932), at the Ziegfeld Theater, and in a single film, the 1937 musical comedy, The Singing Marine.  In 1939 Rockwell had his own short-lived national radio show on NBC, and through the 1940s he was a frequent guest on the radio show of his friend Fred Allen.
 
He married fellow performer Claire Schade in 1915 in Bloomington, Illinois.  Rockwell's first son was George Lincoln Rockwell, the founder of the American Nazi Party.

For many years after his retirement from performing, Doc Rockwell contributed a humor column to Down East, The Magazine of Maine. He had the last page from shortly after the magazine's founding in 1954 to his death. Doc always ended his column with "Maker of fine cigar ashes since 1889."

References

External links 
 photograph of Doc Rockwell 
 
 
 personal reminiscences of Rockwell, Christian Science Monitor
 A collection of Doc Rockwell posters from the Maine Historical Society

1889 births
1978 deaths
American radio personalities
People from Providence, Rhode Island
Vaudeville performers